Queensbury may refer to:

Places

Canada
 Queensbury Parish, New Brunswick

United Kingdom

England
 Queensbury, London
 Queensbury, West Yorkshire
 Queensbury Ward; see List of electoral wards in West Yorkshire

United States
 Queensbury, New York; in Warren County
 Queensbury Union Free School District

Facilities and structures
 Queensbury Mill, Somersworth, New Hampshire, USA; an NRHP-listed building
 The Queensbury Hotel, Glen Falls, New York, USA

Transportation
 Queensbury Tunnel, West Yorkshire, England, UK; a train tunnel
 Queensbury tube station, Queensbury, London, England, UK; a London Underground station on the  Jubilee line
 Queensbury railway station, Queensbury, West Yorkshire, England, UK
 Queensbury Lines, West Yorkshire, England, UK; several rail lines

Other uses
 Queensbury Athletic Club, Toronto, Ontario, Canada; a pro-wrestling promotion

See also 

 Upper Queensbury, New Brunswick, Canada
 Queensbury and Shelf Urban District, West Riding of Yorkshire, County of York, England, UK
 Queensbury Rules in boxing
 Queensbury Academy (disambiguation)
 Queensbury School (disambiguation)
 Queensbury station (disambiguation)
 Queensberry (disambiguation)